The Suffolk Resolves House is the building where the Suffolk Resolves were signed on September 4, 1774. The Resolves were an important predecessor document to the 1774 Continental Association and the 1776 Declaration of Independence.  At that time, it was owned by Daniel Vose, who at his marriage had combined two existing buildings to make one house. The two parts are shown in the two gallery photographs. The oldest framing beams have been dated using dendrochronology which indicates that the trees used in the oldest portion of the house were felled in 1763.

To prevent its demolition in 1950, Dr. and Mrs. James Bourne Ayer moved it from its original location on Adams Street (where Citizens Bank now is) to its present location. They had it restored by William Morris Hunt  and later gave it to the Milton Historical Society, for which it serves as headquarters.

It was added to the National Register of Historic Places on July 23, 1973.

Gallery

See also
National Register of Historic Places listings in Milton, Massachusetts
Carpenter's Hall

References

Houses in Norfolk County, Massachusetts
Milton, Massachusetts
National Register of Historic Places in Milton, Massachusetts
Houses on the National Register of Historic Places in Norfolk County, Massachusetts
Houses completed in 1763
Historical sites in the founding of the United States